Olivia "Bong" Coo (born June 3, 1948) is a Filipino sports administrator and retired professional bowler. She is regarded as the most decorated Filipino athlete. As a member of the Philippine national team, she has amassed a total of 78 medals won in regional and world competitions, 37 of which were gold medals. She is a 4-time world champion and a World Bowling Hall of Fame and Philippine Sports Hall of Fame member.

She is also the first Filipino athlete to make it to the Guinness Book of World Records twice.  She has won a total of 137 championship titles with at least one Masters title for 28 consecutive years.
 
In February 2022, the Philippine Postal Corporation honored her on a stamp as part of the Outstanding Filipinos Living Legends series in honor of the agency's 75th anniversary of its inaugural stamp.

She was named one of the "Greatest International Bowlers of All-Time" by the prestigious Bowlers Journal International in its November 2013 100-year anniversary issue and "Top 24 International Bowlers of All-Time" by the Bowlers Journal International edition in September 2004.

On July 20, 2022, President Bongbong Marcos appointed Coo to serve as a commissioner of the Philippine Sports Commission (PSC). She then previously served as the Officer-in-Charge of PSC.

Early life
Coo married at 17 in 1965 and separated four years later with two sons.

Coo was a talented athlete in high school, playing volleyball and softball at St. Scholastica College, but she had never bowled before. She began bowling casually at the age of 21 as a therapeutic sport following her separation. In 1969, she was encouraged to try out for the team and was accepted, winning her first gold medal at the 1970 Asian Zone Championships in Singapore. Two years later she won five gold medals out of six at the 1972 Asian Zone Championships in Malaysia.

Coo visited Canada in the mid-1970s to see some relatives and stayed in Toronto for six months. She would travel to New York to play match-play pot games against American male bowlers. During this period, her match play skills were sharpened and inspired her to take up the sport more seriously and increased her zeal. When she returned to the Philippines, she hired Madoka Amano, a Japanese coach, to help her train more effectively.

Coo's ascent to the top continued at the Asian Games in 1978, where she won every gold medal but one. Assemblyman Jose Puyat, who owns numerous bowling alleys, offered her $10,000 and a lifetime of free bowling. Pablo Carlos, the team's manager and Toyota dealer, gave her a Corona as a gift. President Ferdinand Marcos stated she could fly for free on Philippine Airlines for the rest of her life.

Sports administration
From 1981 to 1985, Bong Coo worked as the associate sports director for the Philippine National Bank, a government-owned bank at the time, when she began her career in sport administration. This came after She received her 1981 civil service eligibility for professionals. She took time off of work to train for the 1986 Asian Games From 1988 through 1999, she worked as a sports consultant for  SM Prime Holdings Inc. and SM Bowling Centers, as well as a number of private companies and government agencies, including the office of the vice mayor Vicente Sotto III of Quezon City in 1987. Since 1980, she has also had her own line of Bowling-themed clothing.

Coo served as secretary general for the Philippine Bowling Congress Inc. from 2004 to 2011 and the Philippine Bowling Federation Inc. from 2016 to 2022. She has been president of the Philippine Bowling Federation since June 17, 2022.  Additionally, she has served as the Women in Sports Commission's chairperson for the Philippine Olympic Committee from February 2021.  Coo is currently a commissioner of the Philippine Sports Commission since July 2022 and  Officer-in-Charge from August 15–31, 2022. Coo is the first appointment of President Marcos in sports.

She joined the bowling capital equipment and consumer goods markets in the 1990s. She was the first to offer full-service interior design, architecture, and equipment supply. She helped build facilities in Cebu, Cabanatuan, Nueva Ecija, Quezon City, San Juan, Alabang, Batangas, and Manila, among other cities. The cover article of the June 2001 issue of International Bowling Industry Magazine featured her entitled "Lady of All Trades" .

Retirement
She ran a bowling center after retiring from active competition, continued her apparel business, and has been a bowling instructor at the University of the Philippines under the Department of Human Kinetics at the University of the Philippines Diliman since 2001. Her syllabus was approved by the Philippine Department of Education in 2001.

She briefly participated in seniors competitions where she won two Seniors Master Titles in 2008 at age 60 and in 2012 at 64.

Athletic career

Philippine Republic Act No. 9064
Bong Coo is the most decorated Filipino athlete, regardless of gender, in any sport based on Republic Act No. 9064 known as Sports Benefits and Incentives Act of 2001. The law provides cash incentives and retirement benefits for National Athletes who win gold, silver and bronze medals in specific international competitions such as the Olympic Games, Quadrennial World Championships and Asian Games, all three played every fourth year and the Southeast Asian Games (SEA Games).

Guinness Book of Records and other records
Bong Coo is the first Filipino athlete to be inscribed in the Guinness Book of Records for her two-peat record-breaking efforts at the World Championships for All Events The first for her world record scores at the IX Fédération Internationale des Quilleurs (FIQ) World Championships in Manila in 1979, and the second at the (FIQ) World Championships in Caracas, Venezuela in 1983, where she successfully defended her All Events title. She is still the only athlete to win it twice. She also set the highest six-game record of the tournament in 1979 during the doubles gold medal event with Lita dela Rosa.

She has 137 tournament victories to her credit, including masters titles in each of twenty-eight (28) consecutive years from 1971 through 1998. She holds the Philippine record in the Asian Games for most gold medals won and the Asian record for most gold medals won in tenpin bowling with five. She also holds the record for most Asian Championship gold medals won, with 14 in 12 straight tournament appearances spanning 28 years.

All Events Titles
All Events is the combined scores in 4 events: Singles, Doubles, Trios and 5-Team Event. Events are held over consecutive days and played in varying lane conditions and pace totaling 24 games, and the winners are determined by the combined performance in all.  This category is regarded as the most prestigious medal in world bowling and named Most Valuable Athlete by the International Bowling Federation in its later editions.

An All-Events specialist, she is the only bowling athlete to have won titles and set records in this category in major biennial and quadrennial bowling tournaments at the same time in 1986. Bong Coo was named World Bowling Writers Female "World Bowler of the Year" that year.

Summary of her All-Events titles
quadrennial World Championships Fédération Internationale des Quilleurs FIQ World Championship now called Bowling World Championships, consecutive in 1979 and 1983
quadrennial Asian Games, consecutive in 1978 and 1986
biennial Zone Championships (Fédération Internationale des Quilleurs now Asian Bowling Federation Championship now called Asian Championships), 14 years apart 1972 and 1986
biennial South East Asian Games, consecutive in 1981 and 1983

Major individual and masters titles
In addition to her world All-Events titles, Bong Coo also won the QubicaAMF Bowling World Cup (1979), quadrennial Asian Games Singles and Masters (1978), the biennial Asian Championships Masters (twice, 20 years apart 1972 and 1992), the biennial FIQ Zone Championships Singles (twice 1978 and 1984) and the biennial South East Asian Games Masters (1981).

World Championships
At the 1979 World Championships in Manila and the 1983 World Championships in Caracas, Venezuela, Bong Coo won back-to-back All-Events titles. She is remains the only athlete to have won it twice in a row.

She and Lita dela Rosa won the doubles gold and the trios silver with Nellie Castillo at the 1979 World Championships in Manila. Bong and Lita won silver with Arianne Cerdeña at the 1983 World Championships in Caracas, Venezuela.

Asian Games

Apart from the Olympic Games, the quadrennial Asian Games is the most prestigious games among Asian governments.

Bong Coo owns the most number of Asian Games gold medals among all Filipino and Asian bowling Athletes, winning five gold medals in consecutive participations in 1979 and 1986, minus New Delhi in 1983 where bowling was excluded.  In addition to her five gold medals, she won two silver and one bronze medals.

Bong Coo achieved what experts believe to be a historic record by winning all the individual events at the 1978 Asian Games in Bangkok Thailand, she won the Singles, topped the All-Events, and won the Masters.

After three decades, her total five gold medal record haul was equaled by Lee Na-young when she was part of the Korean 6-women Team Gold medal winner at Palembang, Jakarta in 2018.  Lee Na—young won the Gold medals in Doubles, Trios, Masters and All Events at the 2014 Games. Bong Coo also won the All-Events title at the 1978 Asian Games, despite the fact that no medals were awarded, she successfully defended her All-Events title in 1986.

Asian championships
Bong Coo won the most gold medals in the biennial Asian Bowling Championships which includes athletes from Australia, New Zealand  and the Western Pacific, with 14 gold medals in 12 consecutive tournament participation. Her Zone Masters titles were acknowledged by the World Bowling Writers Hall of Fame Committee equivalent to world medals.  To this day she still holds the most gold medals won in the FIQ Zone Championships in one celebration with 5 gold medals in 6 events.  She also earned eight gold medals from Asian invitational championships in the 5th Asian Bowling Federation championships in Bangkok, 1971 and 1973 FIQ Asian Invitational in San Juan and Singapore respectively.

Southeast Asian Games
The Southeast Asian Games also known as the SEA Games, is a biennial multi-sport event involving participants from the current 11 countries of Southeast Asia.

During opening ceremonies of 30th edition of South East Asian Games held in Manila in 2019, she was honored as one of the "Greatest of All Time" athlete flag bearers of the South East Asian Games Federation flag, with legendary sprinter Lydia de Vega, Swimmers Akiko Thompson and Eric Buhain, Basketball star Alvin Patrimonio,
fellow champion bowler Paeng Nepomuceno, billiards great Efren "Bata"Reyes and Olympic silver medalist Onyok Velasco.

The Philippines hosted the Southeast Asian Games for the first time in 1981.  Bong Coo emerged as its most successful Filipino campaigner. She won six medals in six events, four of which were gold medals where she set six individual game records. Bong won the gold in Ladies Doubles with Lita de la Rosa and averaged 221 in Trios en route to an Individual All Events gold medal and became the South East Asian Games Masters champion.

Awards and tributes

International and National Hall of Fame
She became one of the first ever inductees when the  International Bowling Hall of Fame was inaugurated in 1993. The other inductees were compatriot Paeng Nepomuceno and Sweden's Annete Hagre.  The International Bowling Hall of Fame and Museum is located in Arlington, Texas.

She was among the third batch of inductees to the Philippine Sports Hall of Fame with fellow bowlers Paeng Nepomuceno and Lita Dela Rosa on November 22, 2018.

Commemorative stamp
Coo was honored by the Philippine Postal Corporation with a commemorative stamp bearing her image on February 22, 2022.  It marks the 75th anniversary of the first postal stamp and part of the “Salamat-Pagpupugay sa mga Alamat series” (tribute to legend series).

Bong Coo MVP Bowling Ball

Brunswick released the Bong Coo MVP Solid reactive ball in 2001 and the Bong Coo MVP Pearl in 2003. Both bowling balls are approved by the USBC (United States Bowling Congress) and International Bowling Federation for use in international competitions.  In 2003, the Overseas Filipino Workers (OFW) bowlers honored her through the Filipino bowlers of UAE in the "Bong Coo MVP Cup"
 participated in by OFW's from Brunei, Malaysia, Guam, California, Saudi Arabia, Qatar, Kuwait, United Arab Emirates, Hong Kong and Singapore.  She provides free bowling training to youth bowlers from OFW families.

IOC and POC Awards
She was awarded an Achievement Diploma by the International Olympic Committee president Juan Antonio Samaranch in recognition of her outstanding contribution in promoting the development and participation of women and girls in sports, she was 17-years earlier awarded the Philippine Olympic Medal of Honor.

PSA Lifetime Achievement Award and Athlete of the Year
She was honored by the Philippine Sports Association (PSA) a Lifetime Achievement award on February 26, 2019,
 where she was a four time Athlete of the Year awardee and a member of its Hall of Fame.

Athlete of the Millennium
In 2000, Bong Coo was voted one of the Philippines Athlete of the Millennium with Paeng Nepomuceno, boxing legends Gabriel “Flash” Elorde and Pancho Villa, amateur boxers and Olympic silver medal winners Anthony Villanueva at the 1964 Tokyo games and Mansueto “Onyok” Velasco at the 1996 Atlanta Games; Asia’s first chess Grandmaster Eugene Torre, basketball phenom Carlos Loyzaga, swimmer Teofilo Yldefonso, tennis’ Ampon and sprinter De Vega.

Civic Award
She was also named one of the Ten Outstanding Women for the Nations Service (TOWNS) in 1986.  The TOWNS award is conferred every three years by the TOWNS Foundation on Filipino women who have rendered outstanding service to the nation.

Honors
First Filipino Athlete listed in the Guinness Book of World Records
Inaugural member to the World Bowling Writers International Bowling Hall of Fame (1993) at the International Bowling Hall of Fame and Museum, in St. Louis, Missouri, USA with compatriot Paeng Nepomuceno (in 2010 the Hall of Fame Museum moved to Arlington, Texas)
One of the "Greatest International Bowlers of All-Time" by the Bowlers Journal International Bowling Lists 100 Year Celebration, Nov. 2013
Selected to the "Top 24 International Bowlers of All-Time" by the Bowlers Journal International edition, Sept. 2004
Most bemedalled Filipino athlete per Republic Act 9064 "Athletes Incentives Act of 2001"
Most gold medals won by a Filipino athlete in the quadrennial Asian Games with five
Most bemedalled Filipino athlete in the Asian Games in one celebration 1978 held in Bangkok, Thailand
Most Gold Medal in the biennial FIQ Zone Championships with 14 in 12 consecutive participation in 28 years
Most Gold Medal won in FIQ Zone Championships in one celebration 5 gold medals in 6 events
Most successful Filipino campaigner in the 1981 South East Asian Games Held in Manila with 4 gold and 2 silver medals in 6 events
Total of 137 bowling tournament titles
Named "Athlete of the Millennium" by the Philippine Sportswriters Association in 2000
Awarded an Achievement Diploma by the International Olympic Committee (IOC) president Juan Antonio Samaranch in 2000 in recognition of her outstanding contribution in promoting the development and participation of women and girls in sports
World Bowling Writers World Bowler of the year in 1986, the WBW has a membership of over 300 bowling writers worldwide
Fédération Internationale des Quilleurs Woman Bowler of Year for 1992–1993
Voted Asia's Most Durable Bowler in 1992
Voted World Bowler of the Year in 1986
Held the All Events games records in the national, regional level, and world level championships in biennial and quadrennial games simultaneously in 1986
Named " Athlete of the Year" Philippine Sportswriters Association in 1982, 1983, 1984 and 1986
13-time Philippine Sportswriters Association Bowler of the Year
Awarded the Philippine Olympic Medal of Honor in 1983 and Bowler of the Decade
Named Asia's Bowling Queen in 1972
Set three world records in consecutive World Championships in 1979 and 1983, one world record in the 1979 World Cup, seven Asian records in the Zone Championships in 1986 and 1992, five Asian records in consecutive Asian Games in 1978 and 1986 and six South East Asian Games records at the SEAG in 1981
One of the 100 Filipinas featured in Filipina Firsts: A Salute to 100 Women Pioneers 1898-1998
Only athlete included in the Philippines 100 Women of the Century in 2000
Chosen one the country's "Inspiring Mothers" by the Family Today Magazine in 2000
Awarded "Kababaihang Makasaysayan" by the National Centennial Commission- Women Sector – ensured women's visibility in history and nation building through Global Movement for Herstories, 1999
Honored in the first ICHPER-SD Asia Conference Sport Covenant for Women - for uplifting the status of women in sports, 1998
All Filipino Sports Awards Athlete of the Year for Bowling, 1973 and 1975
Named one of the Ten Outstanding Women for the Nations Service (TOWNS) in 1986. The TOWNS Award is conferred every three years by the TOWNS Foundation on Filipino women who have rendered outstanding service to the nation;  The TOWNS Foundation is dynamic group of empowered Filipino women leaders who have contributed positively to shaping the nation's future and serving as a catalyst for economic and social development by providing their time, talent and resources to government organizations
Received citations from both houses of Congress in 1993
Philippine Sportswriters Association Hall of Fame member
50 Greatest Filipino Athletes of All-Time

References

Further reading
Gabi ng Pagpupugay
 Bong bowls them over to take the first gold
Great Gathering
Bong Coo, A living legend in her time, Raffy Japa, Manila Standard, May 27, 1987
Bong Coo Planning to Retire, Manila Standard - Sep 4, 1992 p. 28
1979 World Cup Champion Bong Coo: The Career That Almost Didn’t Happen
Filipina Firsts: A Salute to 100 Women Pioneers 1898-1998" by the Philippine American Foundation
Sulong Pilipina! Sulong Pilipinas! A Compilation of Filipino Women Centennial Awardees"  by the National Centennial Commission
100 Women of the Philippines''. Joy Buensalido & Abe Florendo. 
The Olympic Movement in the Philippines"  by Celso Limjuco Dayrit
All-time great Filipino bowlers: PHL Institute of Sports to improve athlete skills, mental toughness, Primo P. Agatep, Philippine News Agency on January 30, 2017
Bowling Hall of Famer helps OFW kids abs-cbnNEWS.com By JULIE JAVELLANA-SANTOS*
50 Greatest Filipino Athletes of All-Time by the Philippine Yearbook Written and co-edited by The STAR’s Joaquin Henson and Bill Velasco
 The all-time best Filipina athletes MAR 19, 2021 ARIEL IAN CLARITO

z

1948 births
Aksyon Demokratiko politicians
Asian Games medalists in bowling
Filipino ten-pin bowling players
Living people
Bowlers at the 1978 Asian Games
Bowlers at the 1986 Asian Games
Asian Games gold medalists for the Philippines
Asian Games silver medalists for the Philippines
Asian Games bronze medalists for the Philippines
Medalists at the 1978 Asian Games
Medalists at the 1986 Asian Games
Philippine Sports Hall of Fame inductees
Southeast Asian Games medalists in bowling
Southeast Asian Games gold medalists for the Philippines
Southeast Asian Games competitors for the Philippines
Southeast Asian Games silver medalists for the Philippines
Southeast Asian Games bronze medalists for the Philippines
Competitors at the 1985 World Games
World Games bronze medalists
World Games medalists in bowling
Filipino sports executives and administrators
Filipino sportsperson-politicians